Tooth and Nail is a seminal compilation album featuring six early Californian punk rock bands: the Controllers, the Flesh Eaters, U.X.A., Negative Trend, Middle Class, and the Germs.

Production
Except for Negative Trend and the Germs, all bands on Tooth and Nail were co-produced by the Flesh Eaters frontman Chris Desjardins and Judith Bell.

The Controllers, U.X.A., Middle Class, and the Germs were recorded at Program Recorders Studios in Hollywood, California. The Flesh Eaters' songs "The Word Goes Flesh" and "Pony Dress" were recorded at Mental Ward Studios.

With the exceptions of "Version Nation", "Mercenaries" and "I Got Power", all tracks were mixed by Michael Hamilton at Kitchen Sync Studios in Hollywood. "Version Nation" is Desjardins' remixed version of his song "Disintegration Nation", originally produced and engineered by Randy Stodola at Alleycat House for the 7-inch EP Flesh Eaters released in 1978; whereas "Mercenaries" and "I Got Power" are Desjardins and Rik L Rik's remixes of demo recordings done by the third lineup of Negative Trend in November 1978, in a session produced by Robbie Fields from Posh Boy Records at Media Art Studio in Hermosa Beach, California.

Tooth and Nail was mastered by Larry Boden in May 1979 at MCA Whitney Recording Studios in Glendale, California.

Release
Featuring only previously unreleased material, Tooth and Nail was originally issued in mid-1979 on Upsetter Records, in 12-inch LP format. The record was also the debut release for U.X.A.

Reissues
In 1989, 10 years after its debut, Upsetter repressed Tooth and Nail. Since then, the album has remained out of print, although most of its tracks were later re-released separately.

The Controllers' songs were included on their eponymous compilation, released in 2000 on Bacchus Archives, a sublabel of Dionysus Records.

In 2004, the Flesh Eaters' three contributions to the album were re-released as bonus tracks on the Atavistic Records' remastered CD reissue of their first studio album No Questions Asked, originally released in 1980 on Upsetter.

Middle Class' "Love Is Just a Tool" and "Above Suspicion" were featured on their compilation album A Blueprint for Joy: 1978-1980, issued on CD by Velvetone Records in 1995. They were also included on their early recordings collection Out of Vogue: The Early Material, released on vinyl and CD by Frontier Records in 2008. "Archetype", an outtake from the Tooth and Nail recording sessions, was featured on both compilations.

In November 2011, Posh Boy issued the two Negative Trend tracks  on Tooth and Nail, along with their five cuts, credited to Rik L Rik, on the compilation album Beach Blvd, as a downloadable digital collection titled November 1978.

Re-recordings
The Flesh Eaters' "Pony Dress" was re-recorded for the 1982 punk rock compilation American Youth Report, a vinyl LP issued on Invasion Records, a sublabel of Bomp! Records.

A shorter version of U.X.A.'s eponymous song was recorded for their first album, Illusions of Grandeur, released by Posh Boy Records in 1981, on vinyl and cassette tape; while their song "Social Circle" was re-recorded by a reformed U.X.A., still fronted by De De Troit, for their album Tree Punks at Real School, issued on CD by the Belgian label Payola Records in 1997.

The three Germs songs on Tooth and Nail are early versions of the best known tracks of the same titles featured on (GI), the band's first and only studio album, released later in the same year.

Track listing
Where it is necessary, songwriting credits are listed in the format lyrics/music.

Personnel

The Controllers
Kidd Spike – vocals, guitar
Johnny Stingray – bass, backing vocals
Karla Duplantier (aka Karla Barrett, pka Mad Dog) – drums, backing vocals
The Flesh Eaters
Chris Desjardins (pka Chris D.) – vocals
Pat Garrett – guitar (tracks A4, A5)
John Doe – bass (A4, A5)
Don Bonebrake – drums (A4, A5)
Exene Cervenka – backing vocals (A4, A5)
John Curry – guitar (A6)
Scott Lasken – bass (A6)
Dennis Walsh – drums (A6)
Judith Bell (credited as V) – backing vocals (A6)
U.X.A.
Denise Semiroux (pka De De Troit) – vocals
Billy Southard – guitar
Patrick O'Sullivan – bass
Richie O'Connell – drums
Negative Trend
Richard Elerick (pka Rik L Rik) – vocals
Craig Gray – guitar, backing vocals
Will Shatter – bass, backing vocals 
Tim Mooney – drums, backing vocals
Middle Class
Jeff Atta – vocals
Mike Atta – guitar
Mike Patton – bass, backing vocals 
Bruce Atta – drums
Germs (credited as Germs (GI))
Darby Crash – vocals
Pat Smear – guitar
Lorna Doom – bass
Don Bolles – drums

Production
Randolph J. Stevens – executive in charge of production
Chris Desjardins – co-production (A1 to A5, A7, B1, B4, B5), graphic design (cover, graphics)
Judith Bell – co-production (A1 to A5, A7, B1, B4, B5), graphic design (cover, graphics, disc labels)
John Doe – co-production (B6 to B8)
Germs – co-production (B6 to B8)
Larry Duhart – engineering (A1 to A3, A7, B1, B6 to B8)
Zamp – engineering (A4, A5, B4 to B8)
Henry Blau – engineering (B4, B5)
Michael Hamilton – mixing
Larry Boden – mastering
Exene Cervenka – graphic design (cover, graphics, disc labels)
Mick Toohig – graphic design (advising)
Steve Samiof – photography
Tim Norman – typography (front cover)
Production for "Version Nation"
Randy Stodola – co-production, engineering
Flesheaters – co-production
Chris Desjardins – remixing
Production for Negative Trend
Robbie Fields – production
Glen Lockett (pka Spot) – engineering
Rolf Erickson – engineering
Chris Desjardins – remixing
Rik L Rik – remixing

Notes

References

1979 compilation albums
Hardcore punk compilation albums
Various artists albums